Cliff Jenkins (born ) is a former city councillor in Toronto, Ontario, Canada. He represented Ward 25 which was one of the two Don Valley West wards, from 2003 to 2010.

Jenkins was born in Hamilton to a working-class family. He attended McMaster University on a scholarship, and graduated with an undergraduate mathematics degree. He then went to the University of Toronto where he obtained a master's degree in mathematics and a bachelor's degree in education.  He briefly worked as a high school math teacher before joining IBM Canada. He eventually rose to be a client executive at IBM.

He first rose to prominence as the president of the York Mills Ratepayers Association.  He was elected to Toronto City Council in the 2003 municipal election after incumbent Joanne Flint was appointed to the Ontario Municipal Board.
 
In office, was noted for concern for the City's financial state.  He worked on three key objectives:

1. Municipal election finance reform: To reduce undue influence in City business by special interest groups, he and fellow Councillors Michael Walker and Chin Lee successfully advocated that the Ontario government pass legislation enabling reform.  Toronto City Council then adopted a by-law to implement their recommendations—including the prohibition of election contributions by corporations and unions.

2. Making transit an essential service:  To prevent TTC strikes and lockouts that result in gridlock and prevent people from getting to employment, school and medical appointments, he worked with Councillors Cesar Palacio, Michael Thompson and citizens on essential service recommendations—including provisions for contract arbitration with final offer selection.  Council voted 23 to 22 to defeat their proposals.  But soon after, the Ontario Government passed legislation declaring the TTC to be an essential service.

3. Development Charge Reform:  To reduce taxpayer subsidies of residential development, he proposed changes to Toronto by-laws and to provincial legislation—similar to reforms advocated by the Association of Municipalities of Ontario. Council approved only partial increases in development charges and the Ontario Government did not amend the Development Charges Act.

Now in private life, Jenkins formed his own company offering electronic voting services.

References

External links
Former city councillor (archived)

1947 births
IBM employees
Living people
Toronto city councillors